Wrong Cops is a 2013 French-American independent comedy film written and directed by Quentin Dupieux. The ensemble film premiered at the 2013 Sundance Film Festival. It features an ensemble cast including Éric Judor, Mark Burnham, Arden Myrin, Steve Little, Jack Plotnick, Ray Wise, Kurt Fuller, Eric Wareheim, Grace Zabriskie and Marilyn Manson.

Premise
In the not very distant future, where crime has been completely eradicated, a group of crooked cops look to dispose of a body that one of them accidentally shot.

Cast
 Mark Burnham as Officer Duke
 Éric Judor as Officer Rough
 Steve Little as Officer Sunshine
 Eric Wareheim as Officer De Luca
 Arden Myrin as Officer Holmes
 Brandon Beemer as Officer Brown
 Jon Lajoie as Officer Regan
 Ray Wise as Captain Andy
 Marilyn Manson as David Delores Frank
 Daniel Quinn as Neighbor
 Hillary Tuck as Kylie
 Isabella Palmieri as Rose
 Jennifer Blanc as Ruth
 Agnes Bruckner as Julia Kieffer
 Kurt Fuller as Music Producer
 Eric Roberts as Bob
 Steve Howey as Sandy / Michael
 Grace Zabriskie as Donna
 Jack Plotnick as Dolph Springer

Production
The first trailer was launched on November 22, 2013. Executive Producer was Gregory Bernard and the film was produced by Diane Jassem, Sergey Selyanov, Daniel Goroshko and Josef Lieck for Realitism Films.

Critical reception
From Christie Ko of ScreenCrave:

From Alex Koehne of Twitch:

From Scott Menzel of We Live Film did not care for the film:

References

External links 

2013 films
2013 black comedy films
French comedy-drama films
American black comedy films
French black comedy films
English-language French films
Films shot in California
Films shot in Los Angeles
American independent films
Films directed by Quentin Dupieux
American comedy-drama films
2013 independent films
2010s English-language films
2010s American films
2010s French films